Herbert Slater (11 November 1881 – 2 December 1958) was an English cricketer who played for Derbyshire in 1907.

Slater was born in Langley Mill the son of Henry Slater and his wife Sarah Bestwick His father had played for Derbyshire between 1882 and 1887.

Slater made his debut for the Derbyshire team in the 1907 season against Nottinghamshire in July. He opened the batting with captain Levi Wright and scored 21 in his first innings. In the next match against Leicestershire Slater took 2-15, his only wickets in his career. In his remaining matches his performance was indifferent.

Slater was a right-handed batsman and played 9 innings in 5 first-class matches with a top score of 21 and an average of 5.57. He was a right-arm off-break and fast-medium bowler and took 2 wickets with an average of 19.00. He was described as "A good batsman and an excellent fielder". He scored many runs playing club cricket.
 
Slater died in Creswell at the age of 77. Slater's brother, Archibald Slater also played cricket for Derbyshire.

References 

1881 births
1958 deaths
Derbyshire cricketers
English cricketers